A macronucleus (formerly also meganucleus) is the larger type of nucleus in ciliates. Macronuclei are polyploid and undergo direct division without mitosis. It controls the non-reproductive cell functions, such as metabolism. During conjugation, the macronucleus disintegrates, and a new macronucleus is formed by karyogamy of the micronuclei.
  
The macronucleus contains hundreds to thousands of chromosomes, each present in many copies. The macronucleus lacks a mechanism to precisely partition this complex genome equally during nuclear division; thus, how the cell manages to maintain a balanced genome after generations of divisions is unknown.

See also 
Micronucleus

References 

.

Cell nucleus
Ciliate biology